Laura is a rural town and locality in the Shire of Cook, Queensland, Australia. In the  the locality of Laura had a population of 228 people.

It is the centre for the largest collection of prehistoric rock art in the world, including Quinkan Country which is on the Australian National Heritage List.

Geography 
The locality of Laura is on Cape York Peninsula in Far North Queensland. The town of Laura is on the Peninsula Developmental Road,  the only road that extends towards the north of the peninsula, terminating at Weipa. 

Laura is only a few kilometres from the southern entrance to Rinyirru National Park (in neighbouring Lakefield).

Quinkan Reserve 1 (also known as East Quinkan Reserve) is a protected area for the rock art in the south of the locality. Quinkan Reserve 2 (also known as West Quinkan Reserve) is a protected area for the rock art in the east of the locality.

Apart from the rock art reserves, the land use is predominantly grazing on native vegetation.

History 
Aboriginal people have made their home in the Laura River valley for at least 50,000 years. In the wet season, they would camp under rock shelters on the high ground. This is where their rock art can be found. The area was on the borders of Kokowara and Kokojawa lands.

Guugu Yimithirr (also known as Koko Yindjir, Gugu Yimidhirr, Guguyimidjir) is an Australian Aboriginal language of Hope Vale and the Cooktown area. The language region includes the local government area of the Aboriginal Shire of Hope Vale and the Shire of Cook, particularly the localities of Cape Bedford, Battle Camp (in Laura) and sections of the Normanby River and Annan River.

Kuku-Thaypan (also known as Gugu Dhayban, Kuku Taipan, Thaypan) is an Australian Aboriginal language spoken in Hann River, Laura  and Musgrave River and on Mornington Island, within the local government boundaries of the Cook Shire.

Some of the earliest pastoral leases on Cape York Peninsula were taken up in the Laura district. However, the town of Laura did not develop until the discovery of gold on the Palmer River.

The town takes its name from the Laura River, which in turn was named in 1873 by explorer and surveyor Archibald Campbell Macmillan after his wife Laura Bower (née Poingdestre).

In 1873 gold was discovered on the Palmer River. Travellers coming from Cooktown to the Palmer Goldfields would cross the Laura River at Laura. This was a very violent period, as local aboriginal clans waged a war of resistance against encroachment on and usurpation of their lands.  A Native Mounted Police camp was established near the Lower Laura crossing to protect travellers.

Maytown State School opened circa 1877 and closed in 1917. It reopened in 1924 and closed on 1925.

During the gold boom a railway line was planned between Cooktown and the Palmer gold fields. By 1888 the Cooktown to Laura Railway had been built as far as Laura.

Laura Post Office opened on 8 October 1888.

Laura Provisional School opened on 19 March 1889 and closed in 1903.

The railway was extended towards the Palmer gold fields with an impressive bridge over the Laura River opened, to great fanfare, in 1891. However, since the Palmer gold fields were in decline, a new Queensland Government decided to abandon the project. Only one train ever crossed the bridge - the train that ran on the day that it opened. In 1903 the Queenslad Government closed the railway line, but the Cook Shire Council leased it and operated it until 1904 when the Queensland Government decided to continue its operation of the line.

Following the relocation of the Endeavour River No 1 Provisional School building to the town, it reopened on 28 February 1919 as Laura Provisional School, which operated on a part-time basis with Endeavour River No 2 Provisional School and Endeavour River No 3 Provisional School (meaning one teacher was being shared by three schools). However it did not attract any enrolments and so closed on 31 March 1919. The school building was moved again and reopened as Flaggy Provisional School in conjunction with Endeavour River No 2 and No 3 schools.

The rail line contributed to the growth of Laura. It was used by miners and by peninsula cattle properties. The railway finally closed in 1961.

It was during the 1960s that Quinkan rock art galleries were reported by Percy Trezise, an airline pilot who surveyed the area from the air for likely sites and later walked in to rediscover them.

The current Laura State School opened on 31 January 1968.

At the 2006 census, Laura and the surrounding area had a population of 225.

In the 2011 census, Laura had a population of 80 people.

In the  the locality of Laura had a population of 228 people.

Heritage listings
Laura has a number of heritage-listed sites, including:
 Laura to Maytown: Laura to Maytown Coach Road
Peninsula Developmental Road: Quinkan Country

Education 
Laura State School is a government primary (Early Childhood-6) school for boys and girls at Terminus Street. In 2018, the school had an enrolment of 7 students with 2 teachers and 6 non-teaching staff (2 full-time equivalent).

There is no secondary school in Laura. The nearest secondary school is Cooktown State School (to Year 12) in neighbouring Cooktown to the east. However, only some parts of the locality are sufficiently close to enable students to commute to school in Cooktown; distance education and boarding schools would be alternatives.

Attractions 

Some of the world's most extensive and ancient rock painting galleries surround the town of Laura, some of which are available for public viewing. Laura has an Interpretive Centre from which information on the rock art and local Aboriginal culture is available and tours can be arranged.

It also forms the northern apex of the "Scenic Triangle" between Cooktown, Lakeland, and Laura.

Events 
The Ang-Gnarra Aboriginal Corporation is the trustee of the traditional land situated in and around the township of Laura on Cape York Peninsula, who host the Laura Quinkan Dance Festival.  A biennial, three day event for communities gathering to celebrate traditional Indigenous music, dance, crafts and stories.  

This Laura Quinkan Dance Festival began in the early 1980s and is known as the one of the longest running Aboriginal cultural festival in Australia.

In 2009 Tom George  an elder of the Kuku Thaypan clan, presented his history and role in establishing the Laura Dance Festival,  the traditional weaving  exchange occurred at the Laura festival by the Erub Island and Hopevale communities and photographs.

References

Further reading 
 Pike, Glenville. 1979. Queen of the North: A Pictorial History of Cooktown and Cape York Peninsula. G. Pike. .
 Trezise, P.J. 1969. Quinkan Country: Adventures in Search of Aboriginal Cave Paintings in Cape York. A.H. & A.W. Reed, Sydney.
Trezise, P.J. 1993. Dream Road: A Journey of Discovery. Allen & Unwin, St. Leonards, Sydney.
Premier's Department (prepared by Connell Wagner). 1989. Cape York Peninsula Resource Analysis. Cairns. (1989). 
Roth, W.E. 1897. The Queensland Aborigines. 3 Vols. Reprint: Facsimile Edition, Hesperian Press, Victoria Park, W.A., 1984. 
Ryan, Michelle and Burwell, Colin, eds. 2000. Wildlife of Tropical North Queensland: Cooktown to Mackay. Queensland Museum, Brisbane.  (set of 3 vols).
Scarth-Johnson, Vera. 2000. National Treasures: Flowering plants of Cooktown and Northern Australia. Vera Scarth-Johnson Gallery Association, Cooktown.  (pbk);  Limited Edition - Leather Bound.
Sutton, Peter (ed). Languages of Cape York: Papers presented to a Symposium organised by the Australian Institute of Aboriginal Studies. Australian Institute of Aboriginal Studies, Canberra. (1976). 
Wynter, Jo and Hill, John. 1991. Cape York Peninsula: Pathways to Community Economic Development. The Final Report of The Community Economic Development Projects Cook Shire. Cook Shire Council.
Laura: A shared history of a river and a town. Cook Shire pamphlet.

External links 

 Quinkan and Regional Cultural Centre

 
Populated places in Far North Queensland
Towns in Queensland
Rock art in Australia
Shire of Cook
Localities in Queensland